Saltynsky is a rural locality (a khutor) and the administrative center of Saltynskoye Rural Settlement, Uryupinsky District, Volgograd Oblast, Russia. The population was 638 as of 2010. There are 16 streets.

Geography 
Saltynsky is located in steppe, on the right bank of the Saltynka River, 33 km northwest of Uryupinsk (the district's administrative centre) by road. Mokhovskoy is the nearest rural locality.

References 

Rural localities in Uryupinsky District